Abraham Robarts (1745–1816) was an English banker and politician. He was a factor in the West Indies trade, and a director of the East India Company.

Life
Early in his career he was a partner with James Tierney in the firm of Tierney, Lilly and Robarts, Spanish merchants.

He became a Director of the Royal Exchange Insurance Company from 1781 to 1786 and then served as a director of the East India Company 6 times between 1786 and 1815, normally for three years each time.

In 1792 he became a city banker in partnership with Sir William Curtis in the firm of Robarts, Curtis, Were, Hornyold and Berwick, of Cornhill.

Robarts was an uncontested candidate, and won successive terms, sitting until his death in 1816.

He died a wealthy man in 1816.

Family
Robarts married Sabine Tierney, sister of George Tierney, and they had four sons and five daughters. The children included:

Abraham Wildey Robarts
George James Robarts
William Tierney Robarts
James Thomas Robarts
Sabine, eldest daughter, married Charles Thellusson
Sidney, married in 1817 John Madock, Member of Parliament for 
Marianne Jane Roberts, the youngest child

References

1745 births
1816 deaths
English bankers
Directors of the British East India Company
Members of the Parliament of Great Britain for English constituencies
British MPs 1796–1800
Members of the Parliament of the United Kingdom for English constituencies
UK MPs 1801–1802
UK MPs 1802–1806
UK MPs 1806–1807
UK MPs 1807–1812
UK MPs 1812–1818